Canthon pilularius, the common tumblebug, is a species in the beetle family Scarabaeidae. It is found in Oceania and North America.

References

Further reading

External links

 

Deltochilini
Articles created by Qbugbot
Beetles described in 1758
Taxa named by Carl Linnaeus